Romina De Novellis, an Italian performer born in Naples (1982), was a longtime resident of Rome.
After many years dedicated to dance and theater, she graduated from the Royal Academy of Dance de London and continued
her studies at the University of Rome 3. She lives in Paris, where she is a PhD
student in Anthropology et Sociology at the EHESS. Her thesis is on the anthropology of the body.
Her artistic work is on the concept of the body in terms of public processions, installed in urban spaces
and followed by the gaze of passers-by.
Gesture is at the center of these paintings that come to life through her body. Her aim is to show how
a state of trance, alienation and madness, can manifest on the body, especially in the precarious
human conditions that exist on the margins of society (related to employment, wide social networks,
and family). Women, Saints, Daughters, Icons of everyday life, the protagonists of Romina De
Novellis's work originate from her studies in anthropology and ethnomusicology. These women
become a social message and, at the same time, politics.

Performances 
La Pecora
Performance, Musée de la Chasse et de la Nature, Paris, 2013
 The Garland – memory of a family celebration / Le Guirlande – souvenir d’une fête en famille
Frasq festival performance, Le Générateur, Paris 2012
 Forza Francia, Viva Italia !
La Nuit Blanche 2012, Paris
 The Cage – tableau vivant of a beast / La Gabbia – tableau vivant d’une bête
Exposition Noli me Tangere, curator Raffaella Barbato, Disturb, Napoli
The wedding – the weight of a life together
Dimanche rouge festival performance 2012, Paris
The last supper / L’ultima cena
La Nuit des Galeries, Circuito 2012, Parcours Nomades 2012, Mairie de Paris
The cage – tableau vivant of a beast / La Gabbia – tableau vivant d’un bête
Les états limites, exhibition at 7.5 Club, Paris
The Baptisme / Le Baptême
Exposition Corps, Paysages, Mutations, Inception Gallery, Paris
The wake – La Veglia – La Veille
Chez Marc Lenot, Les Lunettes Rouges, blog contemporary art Le Monde, Paris
The Multiplication / La Multiplication
In collaboration with Nadine Sures, Canadian performer, with the support of State of Canada
Zico House – Beirut, Libano.
2011
LABN milk/sperm
Performance/Exposition Resistance, curator Moataz Nasar, Darb 11718 contemporary art center, Cairo, Egypt
Venus wash cloths / Vénus lave les chiffons
Performance/Exposition Conductions, curator David Zerbib, Jeune Création, Le 104, Paris
Beltway / Périphérique
La Nuit Blanche 2011, Circuito festival performing art 2011, Mairie de Paris and Mairie de Clichy
The firefly / La lucciola
Lady Fest 2011, Rome
Tha Multiplication / La Multiplication

References 

1982 births
Italian performance artists
Living people